Gaston Leval (born Pierre Robert Piller; October 20, 1895 – April 8, 1978; Saint-Denis, France) was an anarcho-syndicalist, combatant and historian of the Spanish Revolution.

Leval was the son of a French Communard. He escaped to Spain in 1915 to avoid conscription during the First World War.  In Spain he joined the anarcho-syndicalist Confederación Nacional del Trabajo trade union.  Leval left for Argentina during the dictatorship of Primo de Rivera where he would live from 1923 to 1936. He returned to Spain and became a fighter in the Confederal militias in the Spanish Civil War. Additionally, he documented the revolution and the urban and rural anarchist collectives.

Bibliography

 Gaston Leval, "Anarchists Behind Bars", Summer 1921
 Gaston Leval, "Collectives in Aragon", London, 1938
 Gaston Leval, "Social Reconstruction in Spain: Spain and the World", London, 1938
 Gaston Leval, "Collectives in Spain", Freedom Press, London, 1945 online
 Gaston Leval, "Ne Franco Ne Stalin", Milan, 1952
 Gaston Leval, "Collectives in the Spanish Revolution", Freedom Press, London, 1975 (originally in French, "Espagne Libertaire (1936 - 1939)", Editions du Cercle, 1971)

References

External links
 Gaston Leval Archive

1895 births
1978 deaths
French anarchists
French people of the Spanish Civil War
Historians of anarchism
Anarcho-syndicalists